Bresegard may refer to two municipalities in the district of Ludwigslust, Mecklenburg-Vorpommern, Germany:

Bresegard bei Eldena
Bresegard bei Picher